Merothripidae is a family of thrips in the order Thysanoptera. There are at least 4 genera and 20 described species in Merothripidae.

Genera
These four genera belong to the family Merothripidae:
 Damerothrips Hood, 1954
 Merothrips Hood, 1912
 † Jezzinothrips Strassen, 1973 Lebanese amber, Barremian
†Myanmarothrips Ulitzka 2018 Burmese amber, Myanmar, Cenomanian
 † Praemerothrips Priesner, 1930 Baltic amber, Eocene

References

Further reading

 
 
 
 
 

Thrips
Insect families
Articles created by Qbugbot